Ictonyx is a genus in the family Mustelidae (weasels). It contains two species:

 Saharan striped polecat (Ictonyx libycus)
 Striped polecat (Ictonyx striatus)

References

 
Taxa named by Johann Jakob Kaup